The Women's keirin event of the 2016 UCI Track Cycling World Championships was held on 3 March 2016. Kristina Vogel of Germany won gold.

Results

First round
The first round was started at 15:28.

Heat 1

Heat 2

Heat 3

Heat 4

First round repechage
The first round repechage was started at 16:10.

Heat 1

Heat 2

Heat 3

Heat 4

Second round
The first round was started at 20:05.

Heat 1

Heat 2

Finals
The finals was started at 20:45.

Small final

Final

References

Women's keirin
UCI Track Cycling World Championships – Women's keirin